Europe Today is an early morning business news programme that aired on CNBC Europe from 1998 to 2001.  The programme would check-up on the progress of Asian trading and preview the European trading day.  Its final presenter was Simon Hobbs.  It aired on weekdays from 5:30 am–7:00 am UK time. The show was replaced by Today's Business Europe in January 2001.

1998 British television series debuts
2001 British television series endings
Business-related television series in the United Kingdom
CNBC Europe original programming